Belleville is an unincorporated community in Liberty Township, Hendricks County, Indiana.

History
Belleville was laid out in 1829. The community experienced growth soon after by the building of the National Road through it, but declined in the 1850s when the new railroad missed it by more than a mile.

Geography

Commercial Buildings
A few of the commercial businesses in Belleville are listed below.
The Deer Creek Golf Club is located one mile south of the town. Located in the heart of town is the Belleville Farm Market, which was established in 1952. Locally grown products are sold from April through October, including plants, produce, honey, jellies and more. The Trader's Den, a second-hand furniture store, is also located in Belleville. In 2014 the newly listed business Justin Gorman tool sales was established in Belleville, Indiana.

References

Unincorporated communities in Hendricks County, Indiana
Unincorporated communities in Indiana
Indianapolis metropolitan area